Anon Sangsanoi (born March 1, 1984), is a Thai retired professional footballer who played as a striker. He was the league's top goalscorer in 2008 and 2009 seasons.

International career

Anon has currently played 8 international games for the senior Thailand national team and scored two goals. Anon was called up to new coach Peter Reid's first squad selection, to play in the 2008 T&T Cup hosted by Vietnam.
Despite his formidable scoring record in the Thai Premier League, he is regularly overlooked by the Thai national team.

International

International goals

Honours

International
Thailand U-23
 Sea Games  Gold Medal (1): 2007

Individual
 Thai Premier League Top Scorer (2) : 2008, 2009
 Sea Games Top Scorer (1) : 2007

References

External links
 Profile at Goal

1984 births
Living people
Anon Sangsanoi
Anon Sangsanoi
Association football forwards
Anon Sangsanoi
Anon Sangsanoi
Anon Sangsanoi
Anon Sangsanoi
Anon Sangsanoi
Anon Sangsanoi
Anon Sangsanoi
Anon Sangsanoi
Footballers at the 2006 Asian Games
Anon Sangsanoi